is a Japanese athlete specialising in the 400 metres hurdles. He represented his country at the 2019 World Championships reaching the semifinals. Early in his career he won a bronze medal at the 2015 World Youth Championships.

His personal best in the event is 49.05 set in Fukuoka in 2019.

International competitions

References

1998 births
Living people
Japanese male hurdlers
World Athletics Championships athletes for Japan
Sportspeople from Kagoshima Prefecture
Competitors at the 2019 Summer Universiade